Brad Pelo (born February 6, 1963) is an American businessman, entrepreneur, and co-founder and chief executive officer of i.TV, the company behind tvtag, a second screen app for iOS. Backed by Union Square Ventures, RRE Ventures, Rho Ventures, Time Warner Investments, DIRECTV, and others, i.TV is also  behind the popular namesake app for iOS and Android, and co-created Nintendo TVii for the Nintendo Wii U. Pelo has founded or been a member of the founding team at a number of companies, including Folio Corporation, Ancestry.com, and NextPage.  
He also served on the board of directors of Tokyo-based D&M Holdings, the holding company for leading audio brands including Denon, Marantz, McIntosh Laboratories and Boston Acoustics.
Pelo is also a movie producer and live event producer.

Early life and education
Brad Pelo was born in Missoula, Montana, graduated from Orem High School and attended Brigham Young University.
While in High School Pelo founded his first company and was featured in The New York Times Magazine,
McCall's and SUCCESS magazine as a “teen tycoon”.

Career
In 1987, Pelo co-founded Folio Corporation with his brother-in-law Curt Allen.  The two partners met with success in 1988 when they struck a deal with Novell stipulating that the company would bundle Folio’s software with every NetWare operating system it sold. 
Pelo served as the president of Folio until its acquisition by Mead Data Central, Inc., provider of the Lexis-Nexis computer-assisted research services, in 1992.  
Pelo later was one of the founding team members of Ancestry.com and served as CEO of Ancestry.com’s parent company, Western Standard Publishing.

Pelo later served as president and publisher at Bookcraft, a Utah-based publishing house.  He then founded NextPage, a compliance and information risk solutions provider.  
After that Pelo served as executive producer of a number of feature films including The Legend of Johnny Lingo (2003), Outlaw Trail: The Treasure of Butch Cassidy (2006), and Forever Strong (2008), co-starring Sean Astin.  He continues to be a partner in the production company behind the latter two films, Picture Rock Entertainment.
In 2008 Pelo co-founded i.TV, a social television and second screen company, where he serves as CEO.  As CEO Pelo has secured partnerships for the company with AOL, GetGlue, Entertainment Weekly magazine and Nintendo.
From 2004 to 2010, Pelo served as the senior executive producer of Utah’s largest annual event, the Stadium of Fire.

References

External links 

 

1963 births
Living people
Brigham Young University alumni
American technology chief executives
People from Missoula, Montana